The Pittsburgh International Airport People Mover is a fully automated people mover system at the Pittsburgh International Airport serving Pittsburgh, Pennsylvania. Designed and installed at a cost of $14 million by Adtranz (now Bombardier), it runs in two parallel tunnels to connect the landside terminal with the airside terminal.

It began service upon the opening of the new Midfield Terminal on October 1, 1992, using Bombardier Innovia APM 100 vehicles. To handle increasing passenger traffic, a $9.5 million project was undertaken in 1999. Two cars total were added to the people mover system. One car was added to each train, turning each two-car train into a three-car train. The stations were expanded to accommodate the extra cars. The project also included refurbishing of the original cars.

The proposed remodeling project for the airport, unveiled in 2017, would take the trams out of service permanently, as the proposed Landside Terminal is permanently connected to the existing Airside Terminal.

References 

Airport people mover systems in the United States
Innovia people movers
Pittsburgh International Airport
Railway lines opened in 1992
1992 establishments in Pennsylvania